The 1989–90 Calgary Flames season was the Flames eighteenth season, and their tenth in Calgary.  In defense of their first Stanley Cup championship, despite losing Lanny McDonald to retirement the Flames remained a dominant team on the ice, finishing atop the Smythe Division and the Campbell Conference for the third consecutive year, and 2nd overall in the NHL with 99 points - two points behind the Boston Bruins.

The regular season success did not translate in the post season, however, as the Flames were stunned by the Los Angeles Kings in six games in the first round of the playoffs.  The loss would begin a 15–year period of playoff frustration, as the Flames would not win another post season round until the 2003–04 season.

Following the loss, the Flames fired head coach Terry Crisp, later replacing him with Doug Risebrough.  In three seasons with the Flames, Crisp compiled a 144–63–33 record, with one Stanley Cup win and two Presidents' Trophies.

Individually, Russian superstar Sergei Makarov, who was drafted by the Flames in 1983, was allowed to leave the Soviet Union and play in the NHL.  Makarov finished 4th in team scoring with 86 points.  The 32-year-old Makarov captured the Calder Memorial Trophy as the NHL's rookie of the year.  The selection was controversial, as Makarov had played 11 pro seasons in the Soviet Union prior to joining the Flames.  As a result, the league changed the rules for the following seasons, stating that only players under the age of 26 would be eligible for the award.

Four Flames were named to represent the Campbell Conference at the 1990 All-Star Game: Forwards Joe Mullen and Joe Nieuwendyk, defenceman Al MacInnis and goaltender Mike Vernon.

Regular season

The Flames finished first in scoring, with 348 goals for, and first in power-play percentage, with 27.73% (99 for 357).

Season standings

Schedule and results

Playoffs
The Flames defense of their first Stanley Cup championship ended quickly as Calgary was stunned by the Los Angeles Kings in six games. The loss would begin a string of playoff disappointments for the Flames, who would not win another playoff round until the 2004 Stanley Cup Playoffs.

The Flames 12–4 defeat in game four of the series remains a Flames team record for most goals against in one playoff game.

Player statistics

Skaters
Note: GP = Games played; G = Goals; A = Assists; Pts = Points; PIM = Penalty minutes

†Denotes player spent time with another team before joining Calgary.  Stats reflect time with the Flames only.

Goaltenders
Note: GP = Games played; TOI = Time on ice (minutes); W = Wins; L = Losses; OT = Overtime/shootout losses; GA = Goals against; SO = Shutouts; GAA = Goals against average

Transactions
The Flames were involved in the following transactions during the 1989–90 season.

Trades

Free Agents

Draft picks

Calgary's picks at the 1989 NHL Entry Draft, held in Bloomington, Minnesota.

See also
1989–90 NHL season

References

Player stats: 2006–07 Calgary Flames Media Guide, pg 122
Game log: 2006–07 Calgary Flames Media Guide, pg 138
Team standings:  1989–90 NHL standings @hockeydb.com
Trades: Individual player pages at hockeydb.com

Calgary Flames seasons
Calgary Flames season, 1989-90
Calg
Smythe Division champion seasons